Tamara Fyodorovna Makarova (13 August 1907 – 19 January 1997) was a Soviet and Russian film actress and pedagogue. People's Artist of the USSR (1950) and Hero of Socialist Labour (1982).

Biography
Makarova was born in Saint Petersburg. She enrolled in the MASTFOR theater program in 1924, where she first met Sergei Gerasimov. The two began a romantic relationship and soon married. After World War II, they moved to Moscow, where Makarova began to teach at the Russian State University of Cinematography, which was later named after her husband.

Filmography
 Somebody Else's Coat (1927) – typist Dudkina
 The New Babylon (1929) – can-can dancer
 The Deserter (1933) – Greta Zelle
 The Conveyor of Death (1933) – Anna
 Seven Brave Men (1936) – doctor Zhenya Okhrimenko
 Komsomolsk (1938) – Natasha Solovyova
 The Great Dawn (1938) – Svetlana
 The New Teacher (1939) – Agrafena Shumilina
 Masquerade (1941) – Nina
 The Ural Front (1944) – Anna Ivanovna Sviridova
 The Stone Flower (1946) – the Mistress of the Copper Mountain
 The Vow (1946) – Kseniya
 The Young Guard (1948) – Yelena Koshevaya, Oleg's mother
 First-Year Student (1948) – Anna Ivanovna, teacher
 Tale of a True Man (1948) – Klavdiya Mikhailovna
 Three Encounters (1948) – Olimpiada Samoseyeva
 The Village Doctor (1951) – doctor Tatyana Nikolayevna Kozakova
 Men and Beasts (1962) – Anna Andreyevna Soboleva
 The Journalist (1967) – Olga Panina
 The Love of Mankind (1972) – architect Aleksandra Vasilyevna Petrushkova
 Daughters-Mothers (1974) – Yelena Alekseyevna Vasilyeva
 The Youth of Peter the Great (1980) – Natalya Naryshkina
 At the Beginning of Glorious Days (1980) – Natalya Naryshkina
 Lev Tolstoy (1984) – Sophia Tolstaya

References

External links

1907 births
1997 deaths
20th-century Russian actresses
Actresses from Saint Petersburg
Communist Party of the Soviet Union members
Academic staff of the Gerasimov Institute of Cinematography
Russian State Institute of Performing Arts alumni
Russian film actresses
Russian silent film actresses
Soviet film actresses
Soviet silent film actresses
Heroes of Socialist Labour
Honored Artists of the RSFSR
People's Artists of the RSFSR
People's Artists of the USSR
Stalin Prize winners
Recipients of the Medal of Zhukov
Recipients of the Nika Award
Recipients of the Order of Friendship of Peoples
Recipients of the Order of Lenin
Recipients of the Order of the Red Banner of Labour
Burials at Novodevichy Cemetery